Juan Morales may refer to:
 Juan Morales (distance runner) (1909–?), Mexican long-distance runner
 Juan Morales (hurdler) (born 1948), former Cuban hurdler
 Juan Morales (Peruvian footballer) (born 1989), Peruvian footballer for CD Universidad César Vallejo
 Juan Morales (Uruguayan footballer)
 Juan Morales (cyclist) (born 1949), Colombian Olympic cyclist
 Juan Alberto Morales (born 1961), American Anglican bishop
 Juan Bautista Morales (1597–1664), Spanish Dominican missionary in China
 Juan Esteban Morales, Mexican general
 Juan José Morales (born 1982), Argentine footballer for Argentinos Juniors
 Juan Manuel Morales (born 1988), Uruguayan footballer for Deportivo Saprissa S.A.D.
 Juan Carlos Morales (born 1992), Mexican footballer
 Juan Antonio Morales (born 1969), Spanish basketball player